The 1972 National Rowing Championships was the first edition of the National Championships, held from 22 to 23 July 1972 at the National Water Sports Centre in Holme Pierrepont, Nottingham. These inaugural Championships were held at the newly opened National Watersports Centre in Nottingham.

The Wallingford pair of Tony Norris and Doug Richardson won the junior pair and finished second behind Mike Hart and David Maxwell in the senior pair. Hart & Maxwell would compete at the Olympics shortly afterwards.

Senior

Medal summary 

 * equal second

Junior

Medal summary 

Key

References 

British Rowing Championships
British Rowing Championships
British Rowing Championships